Ochrocephala is a genus of Ethiopian flowering plants in the thistle tribe within the daisy family.

Species
The only known species is  Ochrocephala imatongensis, native to Ethiopia.

References

Cynareae
Flora of Ethiopia
Monotypic Asteraceae genera